Woodside Township is an inactive township in Oregon County, in the U.S. state of Missouri.

Woodside Township has the name of J. N. Woodside, an early settler.

References

Townships in Missouri
Townships in Oregon County, Missouri